Melis Yılmaz (born June 28, 1997 in İstanbul) is a Turkish volleyball player. She is 167 cm tall and plays as a libero. She played in the 2017 CEV Volleyball European Championship.

She has come through the youth setup of Fenerbahçe and plays with jersey number 1 since 2010.

She played for Aydın Büyükşehir Belediyespor, and Türk Hava Yolları SK

Honours

 2014–15 Turkish Volleyball Cup  Champion, with Fenerbahçe Grundig
 2014–15 Turkish Women's Volleyball League -  Champion, with Fenerbahçe Grundig
 2016–17 Turkish Volleyball Cup  Champion, with Fenerbahçe Grundig
 2016–17 Turkish Volleyball League  Champion, with Fenerbahçe Grundig

References

External links
Melis Yılmaz at fenerbahce.org

1997 births
Living people
Turkish women's volleyball players
21st-century Turkish women